is a Mongolian professional sumo wrestler from Ulaanbaatar. He made his debut in July 2009 and reached the top makuuchi division in September 2016. He wrestles for Kokonoe stable. His highest rank is maegashira 2.

Early life and sumo experience
As a child, Munkhsaihan's father was the equivalent of ōzeki in Mongolian wrestling. He was at his father's side most everywhere he went, and his father would take him to judo and wrestling practice often. In addition his father and Asashōryū's father were acquaintances. These circumstances naturally led to an interest in the sumo world. He met former yokozuna Chiyonofuji when the elder came to Munkhsaihan's region on a sumo tour and through Chiyonofuji's invitation, he transferred to Meitoku Gijuku High School, a school well-known for its sumo program. He left the school in his second year and joined Chiyonofuji's Kokonoe stable.

Career
He joined at the same time as Aoiyama and the two attended sumo school at the same time and also graduated together. He weighed only a light 87 kilograms when he first stepped into the ring, and there was concern whether or not he could make it on the dohyō. However, thinking of his father, a popular figure of high rank in Mongolian sumo, made him ashamed at the prospect of quitting early and he resolved to stick it out. From his entry into sumo until he reached the sandanme division, he took the shikona . Upon reaching sandanme in July 2010, as is the custom at his stable, he took the 'Chiyo' part of legendary wrestlers from the stable such as Chiyonofuji and Chiyonoyama, and became Chiyoshōma Fujio. After a little more than a year, in September 2011, he received promotion to the 3rd division known as makushita. Though he bounced back and forth between sandanme and makushita for a period after this, from November 2012 he was re-promoted to makushita with good enough results to become a makushita regular. Up until this point he had to serve stablemates Chiyomaru and Chiyo'ō who were the same age as him, so this was incentive for him to train hard and work his way up the ranks. For the next three years he would soldier on in the third division, moving slowly upward. In September 2015 he had a commanding 6–1 record and took the yūshō for the 3rd division. This put him at makushita 3 for the next tournament where he achieved another 6–1, guaranteeing his promotion to the salaried ranks of jūryō. At the press conference for his promotion, he stated that six and a half years had been a long time, and he had hoped to reach the professional ranks in four years. He also said that he still had further to rise and he would do his best. A party to celebrate his promotion was held at a hotel in Tokyo at which his parents brought traditional Mongolian outfits for Chiyonofuji and his wife to try out.

In his first two tournaments in jūryō starting in January 2016, he attained two winning tournaments. In the following May tournament he only managed a 7–8, but bounced back to a 9–6 record for the July tournament at jūryō 3, earning him promotion to the top flight makuuchi division. He made his top division debut in the Aki basho of September 2016, the first new makuuchi wrestler from Kokonoe stable since the death of his stablemaster Chiyonofuji on July 31 of that year. Following his entry into makuuchi Chiyoshōma had two consecutive winning tournaments and  he is working his way towards the possibility of being a regular makuuchi wrestler. His first tournament fighting all the ōzeki and yokozuna was in May 2017 from the rank of maegashira 2 where he fell short with a 5–10 record.

He was reprimanded during the November 2017 tournament for causing three matta or false starts in his Day 9 match against Hokutofuji by not putting both fists to the ground, and for thrusting at Hokutofuji after the first matta was called.

His string of 498 consecutive matches from sumo entry was broken on the final day of the July 2018 tournament when he pulled out due to an injury. He lost top division status after the May 2019 tournament, but returned to makuuchi in November 2020 after eight tournaments in jūryō.

On the day before the scheduled start of the January 2021 tournament, it was announced that Chiyoshōma had tested positive for COVID-19. He, and all of the other members of Kokonoe stable, subsequently withdrew from that tournament.

Fighting style
Chiyoshōma's preferred grip on his opponent's mawashi or belt is hidari-yotsu, a right hand outside, left hand inside position. He uses both pushing and grappling techniques. His most common winning kimarite are hatakikomi (slap down), yorikiri (force out) and uwatenage (overarm throw).

Personal life
On 25 December 2018 Chiyoshōma married a fellow Mongolian at the Mongolian embassy, a graduate of Mongolian State University she came to Japan for foreign language studies.  They first met in August 2014 and have been in a relationship since January 2016.

Career record

See also
Glossary of sumo terms
List of active sumo wrestlers
List of non-Japanese sumo wrestlers

References

External links
 

1991 births
Living people
Mongolian sumo wrestlers
Sportspeople from Ulaanbaatar
Kokonoe stable sumo wrestlers